The National Anthem of South Africa was adopted in 1997 and is a hybrid song combining extracts of the 19th century Xhosa hymn "" and the Afrikaans song which was used as the South African national anthem during the apartheid era, "Die Stem van Suid-Afrika", with new English lyrics.

The anthem is often referred to by its incipit of "Nkosi Sikelel' iAfrika", but this has never been its official title, which is simply "National Anthem of South Africa".

The committee responsible for this new composition included Anna Bender, Elize Botha, Richard Cock, Dolf Havemann (Secretary), Mzilikazi Khumalo (Chairman), Masizi Kunene, John Lenake, Fatima Meer, Khabi Mngoma, Wally Serote, Johan de Villiers, and Jeanne Zaidel-Rudolph.

Structure
The lyrics employ the five most widely spoken of South Africa's eleven official languages – Xhosa (first stanza, first two lines), Zulu (first stanza, last two lines), Sesotho (second stanza), Afrikaans (third stanza), and English (final stanza). The lyrics are sung in these languages regardless of the native language of the singer. The first half was arranged by Mzilikazi Khumalo and the latter half of the song was arranged by Jeanne Zaidel-Rudolph, who also wrote the final verse. The fact that it shifts (modulates) and ends in a different key (from G major to D major), a feature it shares with the Italian and the Philippine national anthems, makes it compositionally unusual.

History

Background
From the late 1940s to the early 1990s, South Africa was governed by a system known as apartheid, a widely condemned system of institutionalized racial segregation and discrimination that was based on white supremacy and the repression of the black majority for the benefit of the politically and economically dominant Afrikaner minority and other whites. During this period, South Africa's national anthem was "Die Stem van Suid-Afrika", also known as "Die Stem", an Afrikaans language song that chronicled the Voortrekkers and their "Great Trek". "Die Stem" is a poem written by C. J. Langenhoven in 1918 and was set to music by Marthinus Lourens de Villiers in 1921. "Die Stem" was the co-national anthem with "God Save the King" between 1938 and 1957, when it became the sole national anthem until 1994. "Die Stem van Suid-Afrika" was composed of eight stanzas (The original four in Afrikaans and four in English - a translation of the Afrikaans with a few modifications). It was seldom sung in its entirety; usually, the first stanza was the most widely known and sung sometimes followed by the last stanza.

When apartheid came to an end in the early 1990s, the future of "Die Stem van Suid-Afrika" was called into question. It was ultimately retained as the national anthem, though "Nkosi Sikelel' iAfrika", a Xhosa language song that was used by the anti-apartheid movement, was also introduced and adopted as a second national anthem of equal standing. "Nkosi Sikelel' iAfrika" was composed by a Methodist school teacher named Enoch Sontonga in 1897. It was first sung as a church hymn but later became an act of political defiance against the apartheid regime.

The South African government adopted both songs as dual national anthems in 1994, when they were performed at Nelson Mandela's inauguration.

For the 1995 Rugby World Cup, Morné du Plessis suggested that the Springboks learn all the words of "Nkosi Sikelel' iAfrika", and "they did so with great feeling", according to their instructor Anne Munnik.

Inception
The practice of having two national anthems proved to be a cumbersome arrangement as performing both of them took as much as five minutes. This was rectified when South Africa's dual national anthems were merged in abridged forms in early 1997 to form the current national anthem. The new national anthem was performed at an opening of the South African parliament in February 1997, and was published in the South African Government Gazette on 10 October 1997. During the drafting of the new national anthem, it was requested by South African president Nelson Mandela that it be no more than 1 minute and 48 seconds in length (which was the average length of other countries anthems being used for reference). The new English lyrics were adapted from the last four lines of the first stanza of "Die Stem van Suid-Afrika", with the changes made to reflect hope in post-apartheid South African society.

Lines borrowed from the two previous national anthems were modified to be more inclusive, omitting overt reference to specific groups of the country's population groups. Thus, lines from the apartheid-era national anthem's first stanza referencing the Voortrekkers' "Great Trek" were omitted, as "this was the experience of only one section of" South African society. Likewise, the words "Woza Moya", used in "Nkosi Sikelel' iAfrika" were also omitted, as the phrase is a specifically Christian reference, rather than a generically religious one, and thus not acceptable to South Africans of other religions, particularly Muslim South Africans. A new verse found in neither song was also added. The English version of "Die Stem van Suid-Afrika" was less prominent than the Afrikaans version and thus could be changed with little objection or controversy. As such, the English portion of the new South African national anthem was the one which had its lyrics changed from the previous version.

Criticism
In recent years, the South African national anthem has come under criticism for its Afrikaans verse as it was originally part of the national anthem of South Africa that was used during the apartheid era, with some such as the Economic Freedom Fighters  calling for the verse to be removed, supposedly because of this connection. Others defend the inclusion of the verse, pointing out that it is included in large part due to the wishes of the first post-apartheid South African president, Nelson Mandela, who intended its inclusion as a reconciliatory measure for the post-apartheid future of South Africa.

Lyrics

Translations
Besides English, the anthem has also been fully translated into the other official languages of South Africa.

See also

 National anthem of Tanzania
 National anthem of Zambia
 National anthem of the Transvaal
 National anthem of the Orange Free State
 List of national anthems

Notes

References

External links

National Anthem Toolkit  Wikipedia 
The National Anthem
National Anthem of South Africa – Streaming audio, lyrics and information (archive link)
Audio recording of the National Anthem (instrumental only, MP3 file)
Brief introduction to the anthem and notation
The South African national anthem in MIDI format
The South African national anthem in MP3 format

South Africa
National symbols of South Africa
South African songs
Macaronic songs
Music medleys
National anthem compositions in G major
National anthem compositions in D major